Cosmocercoides is a genus of nematode within the order Ascaridida. Nematodes within the genus Cosmocercoides have been found as parasites within the rough-skinned newt, Taricha granulosa. Cosmocercoides includes the following species:
Cosmocercoides barodensis Rao, 1979
Cosmocercoides bufonis Karve, 1944
Cosmocercoides dukae (Holl, 1928)
Cosmocercoides fotedari Arya, 1992
Cosmocercoides kumaoni Arya, 1992
Cosmocercoides lanceolatus Rao, 1979
Cosmocercoides multipapillata Khera, 1958
Cosmocercoides nainitalensis Arya, 1979
Cosmocercoides pulcher Wilkie, 1930
Cosmocercoides rickae Ogden, 1966
Cosmocercoides rusticum (Kreis, 1932)
Cosmocercoides skrjabini (Ivanitskii, 1940)
Cosmocercoides speleomantis Ricci, 1988
Cosmocercoides tibetanum Baylis, 1927
Cosmocercoides tridens Wilkie, 1930
Cosmocercoides variabilis (Harwood, 1930)

References 

Ascaridida
Chromadorea genera